Young and it Feels So Good is the full-length studio album released by the Long Beach, California band, Boris Smile. The album was self-released in 2008.

Track listing
All songs written by A. Wesley Chung and Boris Smile, except "Seasons" (written by A. Wesley Chung, Jon Palsgrove, and Stevie Kugelberg).
"Young and It Feels So Good" - 2:43
"Seasons" - 4:13
"A Cruel Time in Life" - 3:21
"Leper King" - 4:00
"False Words and Hummingbirds" - 4:01
"Birthday" - 1:51
"Home [Sing Along]" - 4:41
"Keep It Safe" - 3:56
"Beartooth" - 3:45
"Marco Polo" - 2:57
"Love's Gotta Come from the Heart" - 4:25
"Megan Eve of Destruction" - 2:09
"Kids Wearing Business Casual" - 2:05
"Will It Last" - 2:17
"Las Aventuras Con Cohetes" - 6:35
"True Colors" - 2:50
"Goodnight Moon (Revisited)" - 2:26
"When We Found the Truth" - 7:12

Tracks “Love's Gotta Come from the Heart,” and "Seasons" have been used on PBS's Roadtrip Nation.

Personnel
A. Wesley Chung: vocals, guitar, percussion, piano, tape recorder
Abigail Davidson: vocals, clarinet
Adam Edwards: trombone
Alan Archambault: electric guitar, lap steel, dobro
Andrew Chen: violin
Avi Buffalo: electric guitar, vocals
Brad Lindsay: mandolin, guitar
Brian Chung: piano
Christian Turner: bass clarinet, bass
Ed Keller: French horn
Hannah Davis: vocals
Jason Chung: bass
Jon Carman: keys, vocals, flute
Jon Palsgrove: drums, vocals
Matt Proffitt: trombone, vocals
Meagan Christy: trumpet, vocals
Rebecca Rivera: bassoon
Rory Felton: bass
Seth Shafer: tuba, keys
Stevie Kugelberg: bass

References

2008 albums